Won Jong-hyun (born July 31, 1987) is a South Korean professional baseball pitcher currently playing for the NC Dinos of the KBO League.

References

External links
Career statistics and player information from Korea Baseball Organization

Won Jong-hyun at NC Dinos Baseball Club 

NC Dinos players
KBO League pitchers
South Korean baseball players
People from Gunsan
1987 births
Living people
2017 World Baseball Classic players
Sportspeople from North Jeolla Province